Chrysolina haemoptera, also known as the plantain leaf beetle, is a species of leaf beetle in the genus Chrysolina. They are associated with plantains (Plantago), particularly Plantago coronopus.

Description
C. haemoptera adult beetles measure 5.0–9.0 mm in length. They have a dull blue-black colouration without any metallic reflection.

References

Beetles described in 1758
Taxa named by Carl Linnaeus
Chrysomelinae